"She Doesn't Mind" is the second single from the Jamaican Dancehall recording artist Sean Paul's fifth studio album Tomahawk Technique. It was written by Sean Paul, Shellback and Benny Blanco and was produced by Shellback and Benny Blanco. It was released on 29 September 2011 on NRJ & Skyrock (French radios), and to iTunes on 31 October. and was released to U.S. mainstream radio on 24 January 2012. Like its predecessor, "Got 2 Luv U", which featured American singer Alexis Jordan, it debuted at number-one in Switzerland. Internationally, the song also topped the charts in Austria, and peaked within the top ten of the charts in several countries, including France, Germany, Israel, Norway, the Republic of Ireland, Romania and the United Kingdom.

It was featured on the European release of the video game Grand Slam Tennis 2.

The official remix features American rapper Pitbull.

Music video
The official music video for "She Doesn't Mind" was released on 25 November 2011. It was directed by Evan Winter and produced by Nestor N. Rodriguez.

The music video was filmed at Long Island's MacArthur Airport in Ronkonkoma, Town of Islip, Suffolk County, New York.

The music video had a special guest: Lisa Jackson from cycle 9 of America's Next Top Model who acted as a TSA officer.

Track listing
 ;Digital download
 "She Doesn't Mind" – 3:47
 ;Digital download – Pitbull remix
 "She Doesn't Mind (Remix) (featuring Pitbull)" – 4:00

Charts and certifications

Weekly charts

Year-end charts

Certifications

Release history

References

2011 singles
Sean Paul songs
Synth-pop ballads
Pitbull (rapper) songs
Songs written by Pitbull (rapper)
Songs written by Sean Paul
Reggae fusion songs
Song recordings produced by Shellback (record producer)
Song recordings produced by Benny Blanco
Number-one singles in Austria
Number-one singles in Switzerland